The Sky Above is a 2010 Brazilian docudrama directed by Sérgio Borges. The film won five awards at the Brasilia Film Festival, including Best Picture.

Awards 
2011: Rotterdam International Film Festival
Tiger Award (Nominee)

2010: Brazilia Festival of Brazilian Cinema
Best Film (won)
Best Director (Sérgio Borges) (won)
Best Screenplay (Manuela Dias/Sérgio Borges) (won)
Best Editing (Ricardo Pretti) (won)
Special Jury Award (won)

References

External links 
 

2010 films
2010s Portuguese-language films
Brazilian drama films
2010 drama films